Thomas or Tommy Greaves may refer to:

 Thomas Greaves (footballer) (1888–1960), English football forward with Stoke 1908–11
 Thomas Greaves (musician) (fl. 1604)
 Thomas Greaves (orientalist) (1613–1676)
 Tommy Greaves (1892–19??), English football full back with Bury and Darlington 1911–28